Litke may refer to:

People
Fyodor Litke (1797–1882), Russian count, geographer, explorer
features named after him—see 
Raymond A. Litke (1920-1986), American electronics engineer

Placenames
Litke, Hungary, a village in Hungary
Litke Deep, an oceanic trench in the Arctic Ocean
 Litke (crater), a lunar impact crater in the large walled plain Fermi